Artaxa digramma is a moth of the family Erebidae first described by Jean Baptiste Boisduval in 1844. It is found in India, Sri Lanka, Myanmar, Nepal, Java, Borneo, and recently from China.

Description
The wingspan of the male is about 24 mm. Its head, thorax, abdomen and forewings are bright orange yellow. Anal tuft orange. There is an orange spot at end of cell in forewing. The two prominent subapical black spots are visible. Hindwings pale orange yellow. Palpi obliquely porrect (extending forward), reaching beyond the frons. Antennae bipectinate (comb like on both sides) in both sexes, however in the male, the branches are long. The mid tibiae have one pair of long spurs, whereas the hind tibiae have two pairs. Female has a large anal tuft. The caterpillar is known to feed on Mangifera, Anogeissus, Terminalia, Shorea, Lagerstroemia, Melastoma and Litchi species.

References

Moths of Asia
Moths described in 1844